The Air Accident Investigation Authority (AAIA) is responsible for investigating civil aviation accidents in Hong Kong, as well as those in other territories involving a Hong Kong-registered aircraft. It was established in 2018 under the Transport and Housing Bureau, currently the Transport and Logistics Bureau of the Government of Hong Kong.

Its head office is on the property of Hong Kong International Airport.

Background
Investigating aviation accidents was previously the responsibility of the Civil Aviation Department (CAD), Hong Kong's civil aviation authority. In 2016, the International Civil Aviation Organization (ICAO) implemented new standards requiring that member states maintain air accident investigation authorities that are independent of civil aviation authorities and related entities. This aims to ensure that accident investigations are conducted objectively, as the regulatory environment and air traffic control system may fall within the remit of an investigation.

The new ICAO standards took effect in November 2016, and were recommended for implementation within two years. To meet the new requirements, the Hong Kong Government set up the AAIA under the Transport and Housing Bureau. Its director, holding the title of chief inspector of accidents, took office on 10 September 2018, thereby marking the formal establishment of the AAIA. The legislative framework for the new agency came into effect on 3 December 2018, formally transferring relevant functions and powers of the director-general of civil aviation (the head of the CAD) to the chief inspector of accidents.

Chief investigators 
The AAIA is led by a Chief Accident and Safety Investigator (formerly Chief Inspector of Accidents):

References

External links
 

2018 establishments in Hong Kong
Aviation organisations based in Hong Kong
Government agencies established in 2018
Hong Kong government departments and agencies
Hong Kong